Harold Hubert Rusland (26 June 1938 – 28 January 2023) was a Surinamese politician. A member of the Nationalist Republican Party, he served as Minister of Education from 1980 to 1983.

Rusland died on 28 January 2023, at the age of 84.

References

1938 births
2023 deaths
Education ministers of Suriname
Surinamese politicians